Wallersdorf is a market town and municipality in the district of Dingolfing-Landau in Bavaria in Germany.

References

Dingolfing-Landau